Morris Fishbein M.D. (July 22, 1889 – September 27, 1976) was an American physician and editor of the Journal of the American Medical Association (JAMA) from 1924 to 1950.

Ira Rutkow's Seeking the Cure: A History of Medicine in America provides a brief overview of Fishbein's influence on American medicine during the Interwar period.

Fishbein is vilified in the chiropractic community due to his principal role in founding and propagating the campaign to suppress and end chiropractic as a profession due to its basis in pseudoscientific practices.

Biography
He was born in St. Louis, Missouri on July 22, 1889, son of an immigrant Jewish peddler who moved his family to Indianapolis. He studied at Rush Medical College where he graduated in 1913. Fishbein served for 18 months as a resident physician at the Durand Hospital for Infectious Diseases.

He joined George H. Simmons, editor of The Journal of the American Medical Association (JAMA), as an assistant and advanced to the editorship in 1924, a position he maintained until 1950. He was on the cover of Time on June 21, 1937. In 1938, along with the AMA, he was indicted for violating the Sherman Anti-Trust Act.  The AMA was convicted and fined $2,500 but Fishbein was acquitted.

In 1961 he became the founding Editor of Medical World News, a magazine for doctors. In 1970 he endowed the Morris Fishbein Center for the study of the history of science and medicine at the University of Chicago. Its first activity was a lecture series taking place in May of that year. Allen G. Debus served as director of the Center from 1971 to 1977. Fishbein also endowed a chair at the university for the same subject, a chair taken up by Debus in 1978. The 7th floor in Shoreland Hall at the University of Chicago was known as Fishbein House, using the Fishbein name as its namesake.

He died on September 27, 1976 in Chicago, Illinois. He was survived by two daughters, Barbara Fishbein Friedell and Marjorie Clavey, and his son, Justin M. Fishbein.

Quacks
He was also notable due to his affinity for exposing quacks, notably the goat-gland surgeon John R. Brinkley, and campaigning for regulation of medical devices. His book Fads and Quackery in Healing debunks homeopathy, osteopathy, chiropractic, Christian Science, radionics and other dubious medical practices.

In 1938, Fishbein authored a two-part article "Modern Medical Charlatans" in the journal Hygeia which criticized the quackery of Brinkley. Brinkley sued Fishbein for libel but lost the case. The jury found that Brinkley "should be considered a charlatan and a quack in the ordinary, well-understood meaning of those words." Fishbein responded that "the decision is a great victory for honest scientific medicine, for the standards of education and conduct established by the American Medical Association."

Fishbein was critical of the activities of Mary Baker Eddy. He considered her a fraud and plagiarist.

Selected publications

The Medical Follies (1925)
The New Medical Follies (1927)
Shattering Health Superstitions (1930)
Fads and Quackery in Healing (1932)
Frontiers of Medicine (1933)
Your Diet and Your Health (1937)
A History of the American Medical Association 1847 to 1947 (1947)
Medical Writing: The Technic and the Art (1957)
Morris Fishbein, M.D.: An Autobiography (1969)

See also

Arthur J. Cramp

References

Further reading
 Theme Issue: The Fishbein Festschrift, Medical Communications, Vol.5, No.4, (1977).
 
 Bealle, Morris Allison, "Medical Mussolini", 'A Comprehensive Text Book on Humanity's Scourge - Medical Politics', Columbia Pub. Co, Washington D.C., 1945.
 Brock, P., Charlatan: America's Most Dangerous Huckster, the Man Who Pursued Him, and the Age of Flimflam, Crown Publishers, (New York), 2008. 
 Fishbein, M., The Medical Follies: An Analysis of the Foibles of Some Healing Cults, including Osteopathy, Homeopathy, Chiropractic, and the Electronic Reactions of Abrams, with Essays on the Anti-Vivisectionists, Health Legislation, Physical Culture, Birth Control, and Rejuvination, Boni & Liveright, (New York), 1925.
 Fishbein, M., The New Medical Follies: an encyclopedia of cultism and quackery in these United States, with essays on the cult of beauty, the craze for reduction, rejuvenation, eclecticism, bread and dietary fads, physical therapy, and a forecast as to the physician of the future, Boni & Liveright (New York) 1927 and AMS Press (New York) 1977. .
 Fishbein, M. (1932). Fads and Quackery in Healing: An Analysis of the Foibles of the Healing Cults, With Essays on Various Other Peculiar Notions in the Health Field. New York: Covici Friede.

External links

 Morris Fishbein Center for the History of Science and Medicine, University of Chicago
 Guide to the Morris Fishbein Papers 1912-1976 at the University of Special Collections Research Center
 American Medical Writers Association
 Time Magazine Cover: Dr. Morris Fishbein — June 21, 1937

1889 births
1976 deaths
American medical journalists
American skeptics
Critics of alternative medicine
Critics of Christian Science
People from St. Louis
JAMA editors